Nicola Jane "Nikki" Campbell (born 9 September 1980) is an Australian professional golfer.

Campbell was born in Mississauga, Ontario, Canada. She moved with her family to Australia in 1983. At the age of 12 she began playing golf at the Federal Golf Club in Canberra. She turned pro in 2002, and has played mostly on the LPGA of Japan Tour, but has played in some LPGA Tour tournaments.  She has won two tournaments, most recently the Fujitsu Ladies at the Seven Hundred Club in Chiba, Japan.

Her brother Chris Campbell is a professional golfer on the Japan Golf Tour.

Professional wins (3)

LPGA of Japan Tour wins (2)
2006 Suntory Ladies Open
2009 Fujitsu Ladies

ALPG Tour wins (1)
2005 ABC Learning Centres & FADL Group Ladies Classic

Team appearances
Amateur
Tasman Cup (representing Australia): 2001 (winners)
Queen Sirikit Cup (representing Australia): 2002

Professional
Lexus Cup (representing International team): 2006, 2007, 2008 (winners)
The Queens (representing Australia): 2015

References

External links

Nikki Campbell at the Golf Australia official site (archived)

Canadian female golfers
Australian female golfers
ALPG Tour golfers
LPGA of Japan Tour golfers
Ladies European Tour golfers
Golfing people from Ontario
Canadian emigrants to Australia
Sportspeople from Canberra
Sportspeople from Mississauga
1980 births
Living people